Kim Bo-nam (born 19 October 1961) is a South Korean cross-country skier. He competed in the men's 15 kilometre event at the 1984 Winter Olympics.

References

1961 births
Living people
South Korean male cross-country skiers
Olympic cross-country skiers of South Korea
Cross-country skiers at the 1984 Winter Olympics
Place of birth missing (living people)
20th-century South Korean people